Paul McLaughlin (born 9 December 1965) is a Scottish former footballer.

References 

1965 births
Living people
People from Johnstone
Scottish footballers
Clydebank F.C. (1965) players
Queen's Park F.C. players
Celtic F.C. players
Partick Thistle F.C. players
Derry City F.C. players
Ards F.C. players
Scottish Football League players
League of Ireland players
NIFL Premiership players
Footballers from Renfrewshire
Association football fullbacks